David Hume coined a sceptical, reductionist viewpoint on causality that inspired the logical-positivist definition of empirical law that "is a regularity or universal generalization of the form 'All Cs are Es' or, whenever C, then E". The Scottish philosopher and economist believed that human mind is not equipped with the a priori  ability to observe causal relations. What can be experienced is one event following another. The reductionist approach to causation can be exemplified with the case of two billiard balls: one ball is moving, hits another one and stops, and the second ball is moving.

In A Treatise of Human Nature Hume coined two definitions of the cause in a following way:

also fixed eight general rules that can help in recognizing which objects are in cause-effect relation, the main four are as following:

See also 
Humeanism

References

Further reading
 

David Hume
Humeanism
Causality